Laura Lima (born 1971 in Minas Gerais, Brazil) is an artist, winner of the Bonnefanten Award 2014, 50,000 Euros and solo exhibition at Bonnefantenmuseum, autumn 2014.

A piece of her work, Sombra de Cinema (Cinema Shadow), has been described as "not filmmaking, it is perhaps reality. It is not theatre,it is not installation, maybe fiction. It is not performance."

The artist was accused by two women of being of being pressured to violate themselves during a performance at the Institute of Contemporary Art (ICA) in Miami. The installation The Inverse was made by a long rope, which tip was inserted in the women's vaginas.

References

Brazilian contemporary artists
Living people
1971 births